Brierley Hill War Memorial is a war memorial in Brierley Hill, Dudley, England.

Erected after World War I, the memorial stands outside St. Michael's church and was unveiled on 12 November 1921. It also now commemorates the dead of World War II, the Korean War, Cyprus Emergency and Malayan Emergency, on separate tablets.

The memorial, based on designs by Councillor J.T. Fereday, with additional work by local industrialist and preacher Francis Lane, consists of a statue of a charging infantry soldier, in World War I uniform and carrying a rifle with bayonet fitted, on a square granite column which also features four relief sculptures. The column sits on a limestone terrace with metal railings, supported by brick retaining walls, at the foot of which is a cannon. The statue, panels and corner columns of the plinth are of Sicilian marble. The terrace and statue overlook the nearby Clent Hills.

The statue was modelled from photographs of Stanley Harley, the first man from Brierley Hill awarded the Distinguished Conduct Medal, and made by George Brown and Sons of Kidderminster.

The cannon was made by the Brierley Hill firm of Bailey and Pegg in the 18th century.

The four reliefs depict:

 Royal Army Medical Corps tending the wounded (facing Church Street)
 artillery in action (facing High Street)
 soldiers going 'over the top' (facing away from Church Street)
 HMS Arethusa sending out its boats to rescue German sailors from a ship it had sunk (facing away from High Street)

Below the four reliefs are the inscriptions: "For freedom", "For homeland", "For righteousness", and "For kindred".

Three of the four faces of the column carry the names of the dead of World War I, numbering 205 in all. The fourth, north, face carries the inscription (all in upper case):

At the foot of the column are inscribed the names of four theatres of war, "France", "Flanders", "Gallipoli", and  "Palestine".

The memorial was afforded Grade II listed status in January 2015, for its historic and artistic interest and sculptural value, giving it legal protection from unauthorised alteration or demolition. It was restored in 2021, with two new interpretation panels installed adjacent to it.

Notes

References

External links 

 Blog post investigating the identity of those listed on the memorial

War Memorial
Monuments and memorials in the West Midlands (county)
Grade II listed monuments and memorials
Grade II listed buildings in the West Midlands (county)
1921 sculptures